Pavel Sedov (born January 12, 1982) is a Russian former professional ice hockey forward. He was selected by Tampa Bay Lightning in the 5th round (161st overall) of the 2000 NHL Entry Draft.
Sedov has played in the Russian Superleague with Khimik Moscow Oblast during the 2003-04 season.

Career statistics

References

External links

Living people
Tampa Bay Lightning draft picks
1982 births
Russian ice hockey forwards
People from Voskresensk
Sportspeople from Moscow Oblast